The 27th British Academy Film Awards, given by the British Academy of Film and Television Arts in 1974, honoured the best films of 1973.

Winners and nominees 
BAFTA Fellowship: David Lean

Statistics

See also
 46th Academy Awards
 26th Directors Guild of America Awards
 31st Golden Globe Awards
 26th Writers Guild of America Awards

Film027
1973 film awards
1974 in British cinema
1973 awards in the United Kingdom